This is a list of genera in the subfamily Delphacinae.

Delphacinae genera

 Abbrosoga Caldwell in Caldwell and Martorell, 1951
 Achorotile Fieber, 1866
 Acrodelphax Fennah, 1965
 Aethodelphax Bartlett and Hamilton, 2011
 Afrocoronacella Asche, 1988
 Afrokalpa Fennah, 1969
 Afrosellana Asche, 1988
 Afrosydne Fennah, 1969
 Agrisicula Asche, 1980
 Akemetopon Weglarz and Bartlett, 2011
 Akilas Distant, 1916
 Aloha Kirkaldy, 1904
 Altekon Fennah, 1975
 Ambarvalia Distant, 1917
 Amblycotis Stål, 1853
 Anchidelphax Fennah, 1965
 Anchodelphax Fennah, 1965
 Anectopia Kirkaldy, 1907
 Aneuidellana Asche, 1988
 Aneuides Fennah, 1969
 Antidryas Asche, 1998
 Aoyuanus Ding and Chen in Chen, Li and Ding, 2001
 Aplanodes Fennah, 1965
 Araeopus Spinola, 1839
 Arcifrons Ding and Yang in Ding et al., 1986
 Arcofaciella Fennah, 1956
 Arcofacies Muir, 1915
 Asiracemus Asche, 1988
 Asiracina Melichar, 1912
 Bakerella Crawford, 1914
 Bambucibatus Muir, 1915
 Bambusiphaga Huang and Ding in Huang et al., 1979
 Belocera Muir, 1913
 Bostaera Ball, 1902
 Brachycraera Muir, 1916
 Caenodelphax Fennah, 1965
 Calbodus Spinola, 1852
 Calisuspensus Ding, 2006
 Calligypona Sahlberg, 1871
 Cantoreanus Dlabola, 1971
 Carinodelphax Ding and Yang, 1987
 Carinofrons Chen and Li, 2000
 Cemopsis Fennah, 1978
 Cemus Fennah, 1964
 Changeondelphax Kwon, 1982
 Chilodelphax Vilbaste, 1968
 Chionomus Fennah, 1971
 Chloriona Fieber, 1866
 Chlorionidea Löw, 1885
 Clydonagma Fennah, 1969
 Columbiana Muir, 1919
 Columbisoga Muir, 1921
 Conocraera Muir, 1916
 Conomelus Fieber, 1866
 Consociata Qin and Zhang, 2006
 Coracodelphax Vilbaste, 1968
 Cormidius Emeljanov, 1972
 Coronacella Metcalf, 1950
 Cotoya Anufriev, 1977
 Criomorphus Curtis, 1833
 Curtometopum Muir, 1926
 Delphacellus Haupt, 1929
 Delphacinus Fieber, 1866
 Delphacodes Fieber, 1866
 Delphacodoides Muir, 1929
 Delphax Fabricius, 1798
 Dianus Ding, 2006
 Dicentropyx Emeljanov, 1972
 Dicranotropis Fieber, 1866
 Dictyophorodelphax Swezey, 1907
 Dingiana Qin, 2005
 Diodelphax Yang, 1989
 Ditropis Kirschbaum, 1868
 Ditropsis Wagner, 1963
 Dogodelphax Lindberg, 1956
 Ecdelphax Yang, 1989
 Elachodelphax Vilbaste, 1965
 Emelyanodelphax Koçak, 1981
 Emoloana Asche, 2000
 Eoeurysa Muir, 1913
 Eorissa Fennah, 1965
 Epeurysa Matsumura, 1900
 Eripison Fennah, 1969
 Eshanus Ding, 2006
 Euconomelus Haupt, 1929
 Euconon Fennah, 1975
 Euidastor Fennah, 1969
 Euidellana Metcalf, 1950
 Euidelloides Muir, 1926
 Euides Fieber, 1866
 Euidopsis Ribaut, 1948
 Eumetopina Breddin, 1896
 Eurybregma Scott, 1875
 Eurysa Fieber, 1866
 Eurysanoides Holzinger, Kammerlander and Nickel, 2003
 Eurysella Emeljanov, 1995
 Eurysula Vilbaste, 1968
 Falcotoya Fennah, 1969
 Fangdelphax Ding, 2006
 Ferganodelphax Dubovsky, 1970
 Flastena Nast, 1975
 Flavoclypeus 
 Florodelphax Vilbaste, 1968
 Formodelphax Yang, 1989
 Ganus Ding, 2006
 Garaga Anufriev, 1977
 Glabrinotum Ding, 2006
 Gravesteiniella Wagner, 1963
 Gufacies Ding, 2006
 Guidelphax Ding, 2006
 Hadeodelphax Kirkaldy, 1906
 Hadropygos Gonzon and Bartlett, 2008
 Haerinella Fennah, 1965
 Hagamiodes Fennah, 1975
 Halmyra Mitjaev, 1971
 Hapalomelus Stål, 1853
 Haplodelphax Kirkaldy, 1907
 Harmalia Fennah, 1969
 Harmalianodes Asche, 1988
 Herbalima Emeljanov, 1972
 Himeunka Matsumura and Ishihara, 1945
 Hirozuunka Matsumura and Ishihara, 1945
 Holzfussella Schmidt, 1926
 Homosura Melichar, 1912
 Horcoma Fennah, 1969
 Horcomana Asche, 1988
 Horvathianella Anufriev, 1980
 Hyledelphax Vilbaste, 1968
 Idiobregma Anufriev, 1972
 Ilburnia White, 1878
 Indozuriel Fennah, 1975
 Ishiharodelphax Kwon, 1982
 Isodelphax Fennah, 1963
 Isogaetis Fennah, 1969
 Issedonia Emeljanov, 1972
 Iubsoda Nast, 1975
 Izella Fennah, 1965
 Jassidaeus Fieber, 1866
 Javesella Fennah, 1963
 Jinlinus Ding, 2006
 Kakuna Matsumura, 1935
 Kartalia Koçak, 1981
 Kazachicesa Koçak and Kemal, 2010
 Kelisoidea Beamer, 1950
 Keyflana Beamer, 1950
 Kormus Fieber, 1866
 Kosswigianella Wagner, 1963
 Kusnezoviella Vilbaste, 1965
 Laccocera Van Duzee, 1897
 Lacertina Remes Lenicov and Rossi Batiz, 2011
 Laminatopina Qin and Zhang, 2007
 Lanaphora Muir, 1915
 Laodelphax Fennah, 1963
 Laoterthrona Ding and Huang in Ding et al., 1980
 Latistria Huang and Ding in Huang et al., 1980
 Leialoha Kirkaldy, 1910
 Leptodelphax Haupt, 1927
 Leptoeurysa Fennah, 1988
 Leucydria Emeljanov, 1972
 Liburnia Stål, 1866
 Liburniella Crawford, 1914
 Lisogata Ding, 2006
 Litemixia Asche, 1980
 Litochodelphax Asche, 1982
 Longtania Ding, 2006
 Luda Ding, 2006
 Luxorianella Asche, 1994
 Macrocorupha Muir, 1926
 Macrotomella Van Duzee, 1897
 Mahmutkashgaria Koçak and Kemal, 2008
 Makarorysa Remane and Asche, 1986
 Malaxa Melichar, 1914
 Malaxella Ding and Hu in Ding et al., 1986
 Malaxodes Fennah, 1967
 Maosogata Ding, 2006
 Marquedryas Asche, 1998
 Matsumuranoda Metcalf, 1943
 Matutinus Distant, 1917
 Megadelphax Wagner, 1963
 Megamelanus Ball, 1902
 Megamelodes Le Quesne, 1960
 Megamelus Fieber, 1866
 Mengdelphax Ding in Ding and Zhang, 1994
 Meristopsis Kennedy, Bartlett and Wilson, 2012
 Mestus Motschulsky, 1863
 Metadelphax Wagner, 1963
 Metroma Ding, 2006
 Metropis Fieber, 1866
 Micistylus Guo and Liang, 2006
 Micreuides Fennah, 1969
 Mirabella Emeljanov, 1982
 Miranus Chen and Ding in Chen, Li and Ding, 2001
 Mirocauda Chen, 2003
 Monospinodelphax Ding, 2006
 Mucillnata Qin and Zhang, 2010
 Muellerianella Wagner, 1963
 Muirodelphax Wagner, 1963
 Nanotoya Fennah, 1975
 Nataliana Muir, 1926
 Nazugumia Koçak and Kemal, 2008
 Necodan Fennah, 1975
 Nemetor Fennah, 1969
 Neobelocera Ding and Yang in Ding, Yang and Hu, 1986
 Neocarinodelphax Chen and Tsai, 2009
 Neoconon Yang, 1989
 Neodicranotropis Yang, 1989
 Neogadora Fennah, 1969
 Neomalaxa Muir, 1918
 Neomegamelanus McDermott, 1952
 Neometopina Yang, 1989
 Neoperkinsiella Muir, 1926
 Neoterthrona Yang, 1989
 Nesodryas Kirkaldy, 1908
 Nesorestias Kirkaldy, 1908
 Nesorthia Fennah, 1962
 Nesosydne Kirkaldy, 1907
 Nesothoe Kirkaldy, 1908
 Neunkanodes Yang, 1989
 Neuterthron Ding, 2006
 Nicetor Fennah, 1964
 Nilaparvata Distant, 1906
 Niphisia Emeljanov, 1966
 Nothodelphax Fennah, 1963
 Nothokalpa Fennah, 1975
 Nothorestias Muir, 1917
 Notogryps Fennah, 1965
 Notohyus Fennah, 1965
 Numata Matsumura, 1935
 Numathriambus Asche, 1988
 Numatodes Fennah, 1964
 Nycheuma Fennah, 1964
 Oaristes Fennah, 1964
 Oncodelphax Wagner, 1963
 Onidodelphax Yang, 1989
 Opiconsiva Distant, 1917
 Orcaenas Fennah, 1969
 Orchesma Melichar, 1903
 Orientoya Chen and Ding in Chen, Li and Ding, 2001
 Palego Fennah, 1978
 Paraconon Yang, 1989
 Paracorbulo Tian and Ding in Tian, Ding and Kuoh, 1980
 Paradelphacodes Wagner, 1963
 Paraliburnia Jensen-Haarup, 1917
 Paramestus Ding, 2006
 Paranectopia Ding and Tian, 1981
 Paratoya Ding, 2006
 Pareuidella Beamer, 1951
 Parkana Beamer, 1950
 Partoya Asche, 1988
 Pastiroma Dlabola, 1967
 Peliades Jacobi, 1928
 Penepissonotus Beamer, 1950
 Peregrinus Kirkaldy, 1904
 Perkinsiella Kirkaldy, 1903
 Phacalastor Kirkaldy, 1906
 Phrictopyga Caldwell in Caldwell & Martorell, 1951
 Phyllodinus Van Duzee, 1897
 Pissonotus Van Duzee, 1897
 Plagiotropis Emeljanov, 1993
 Platycorpus Ding, 1983
 Platyeurysa Fennah, 1988
 Platypareia Muir, 1934
 Platytibia Ding, 2006
 Porcellus Emeljanov, 1972
 Prasliniana Asche, 1998
 Procidelphax Bartlett, 2010
 Prodelphax Yang, 1989
 Prokelisia Osborn, 1905
 Pseudaraeopus Kirkaldy, 1904
 Pseudembolophora Muir, 1920
 Pseudodelphacodes Wagner, 1963
 Pseudomacrocorupha Muir, 1930
 Pseudosogata Ding, 2006
 Pundaluoya Kirkaldy, 1903
 Purohita Distant, 1906
 Pygospina Caldwell in Caldwell & Martorell, 1951
 Qianlia Ding, 2006
 Queenslandicesa Koçak and Kemal, 2010
 Ramidelphax Qin and Zhang, 2006
 Rectivertex Guo and Liang, 2006
 Remanodelphax Drosopoulos, 1982
 Rhinodelphax Muir, 1934
 Rhinotettix Stål, 1853
 Rhombotoya Fennah, 1975
 Ribautodelphax Wagner, 1963
 Rotundifronta Beamer, 1950
 Saccharosydne Kirkaldy, 1907
 Sardia Melichar, 1903
 Scolopygos Bartlett, 2002
 Scotoeurysa Fennah, 1988
 Scottianella Anufriev, 1980
 Sembrax Fennah, 1969
 Shadelphax Ding, 2006
 Shijidelphax Ding, 2006
 Sibirodelphax Vilbaste, 1980
 Sinolacme Fennah, 1978
 Sinoperkinsiella Ding, 1983
 Smaroides Fennah, 1988
 Smicrotatodelphax Kirkaldy, 1906
 Sogata Distant, 1906
 Sogatella Fennah, 1956
 Sogatellana Kuoh in Huang et al., 1980
 Sogatopsis Muir, 1913
 Sparnia Stål, 1862
 Spartidelphax Bartlett & Webb, 2014
 Specinervures Kuoh and Ding, 1980
 Spinaprocessus Ding, 2006
 Spinidelphacella Asche, 1988
 Stiroma Fieber, 1866
 Stiromella Wagner, 1963
 Stiromeurysa Dlabola, 1965
 Stiromoides Vilbaste, 1971
 Stobaera Stål, 1859
 Stolbax Fennah, 1969
 Strophalinx Fennah, 1969
 Struebingianella Wagner, 1963
 Sulix Fennah, 1965
 Syndelphax Fennah, 1963
 Synpteron Muir, 1926
 Tagosodes Asche and Wilson, 1990
 Tarophagus Zimmerman, 1948
 Temenites Fennah, 1965
 Terthron Fennah, 1965
 Terthronella Vilbaste, 1968
 Thrasymemnon Fennah, 1965
 Thriambus Fennah, 1964
 Thymobares Fennah, 1964
 Thymodelphax Asche, 1988
 Toya Distant, 1906
 Toyalana Asche, 1988
 Toyoides Matsumura, 1935
 Trichodelphax Vilbaste, 1968
 Triloris Fennah, 1969
 Tropidocephala Stål, 1853
 Tsaurus Yang, 1989
 Tumidagena McDermott, 1952
 Ulanar Fennah, 1975
 Unkanodella Vilbaste, 1968
 Unkanodes Fennah, 1956
 Veo Fennah, 1978
 Wuyia Ding, 1991
 Xanthodelphax Wagner, 1963
 Xinchloriona Ding, 2006
 Yalia Ding, 2006
 Yangsinolacme Ding, 2006
 Yanunka Ishihara, 1952
 Yichunus Ding, 2006
 Yuanchia Chen and Tsai, 2009
 Yukonodelphax Wilson, 1992
 Zanchetrius Fennah, 1978
 Zhuangella Ding, 2006
 Zhudelphax Ding, 2006

References

Delphacinae